The 1969 Kilkenny Senior Hurling Championship was the 75th staging of the Kilkenny Senior Hurling Championship since its establishment by the Kilkenny County Board in 1887. The championship began on 8 June 1969 and ended on 19 April 1970.

Rower-Inistioge were the defending champions, however, they were defeated by Galmoy in the second round.

On 19 April 1970, James Stephens won the championship after an 8–05 to 2–07 defeat of Fenians in the final. It was their third championship title overall and their first title since 1937.

Format change

At the Kilkenny County Convention on 24 January 1969, it was decided to change the format of the championship by introducing a losers' group for teams defeated in the first round. The winners of the losers' group entered the championship proper at the semi-final stage.

Team changes

To Championship

Promoted from the Kilkenny Junior Hurling Championship
 Fenians

Results

First round

Tullaroan received a bye.

Winners' group

First round

Second round

Losers' group

First round

Second round

Semi-finals

Final

Championship statistics

Miscellaneous

 Following their semi-final defeat, Mooncoin lodged an objection against Fenians based on an alleged illegality in the registration of a member of their team. The objection was not upheld, however, it did result in a delay to the playing of the final.

References

Kilkenny Senior Hurling Championship
Kilkenny Senior Hurling Championship